The history of the Jews in Affaltrach in Obersulm, Germany reaches back to the 17th century and ended during the Holocaust in the 20th century.

Affaltrach is a village in South West Germany, incorporated to the Obersulm municipality, which is located about 50 km north east of Stuttgart. The village Jewish synagogue and cemetery are the last remnants of the now abandoned Affaltrach Jewish community.

History

Before the 19th century
Jews began to settle in Affaltrach in 1660, under the protection of the ruling Knights Hospitaller order. In 1683, three or four Jewish families were living in Affaltrach. By 1749, the Jewish community of Affaltrach reached to about 17 families, dealing mainly with trading cattle, money and goods. A Jewish cemetery was established in 1706 and can still be visited today.

19th century

During the 19th century, the Jewish community of Affaltrach was bigger than at any other time: In 1807, 110 Jews (about 11% of total population); 1843, 164 Jews; and 1858, 219 Jews. Due to emigration to bigger cities and other reasons, during the second half of the 19th century the community started to minimize to 151 in 1869, 79 in 1886 and 28 in 1910 (3.75% of the total population).

In 1861, a district report "Beschreibung des Oberamts Weinsberg", was written in Stuttgart by F.L.I Dillenius, depicting the geographical, demographic and economical conditions of the Weinsberg district ("Oberamt Weinsberg"), an administrative area operated between 1755 and 1926, that Affaltrach was part of. The report stated that Affaltrach had 990 inhabitants in 1861, among them 219 Jews. It is also stated that in 1856, 41 children learned in the Jewish school. In addition, trade was mostly mediated by Jews.

20th century
After the beginning of the industrialisation and with the 19th century liberal Jew legislation, Jews from rural areas settled to the bigger cities. That's why the
Jewish population of Affaltrach was decreasing, so there were only about 21 people left in 1921. During World War I, three Jews from Affaltrach who were drafted to the German military died in service, and were buried at the local Jewish cemetery. The names of the Jewish soldiers were erased from the town's war memorial during the Nazi Period. A memorial in their honor was also erected in the Jewish cemetery, which is still there today. In the wake of World War II, the town Jews were denied access to their shops, and they were eventually deported out of town between 1941 and 1943. The town economy was largely depended on Jewish businesses. Two of the three local grocery stores were owned by Jews, in addition to two butchers, a baker and a clothier.

As shown by the documentation of the Jewish victims of the Nazi regime, most Jews living in Affaltrach in the 20th century were older than 40 years old.

Victims of the Nazi regime

These are the names of the Jews who lived in Affaltrach prior to the holocaust and perished among all other European Jews:

 Emanuel Grunwald (born 1880)
 Ludwig Grunwald (1871)
 Benedict Kaufmann (1880)
 Isak Kaufmann (1860)
 Karoline Kirschhausen (Kaufmann) (1863)
 Albert Levi (1883)
 Hugo Levi (1886)
 Aron Lindner (1883)
 Mina Man (Rotschild) (1885)
 Paula Nussbaum (Thalheimer) (1900)
 Rosa Rotschild (Lindner) (1876)
 Ernestine Schwab (Lindner) (1878)
 Civie Selz (Bogdanow) (1895)
 Ernst Selz (1895)
 Sigmund Selz (1888)
 Max Arthur Thalheimer (1890)
 August Thalheimer (1884)

Sights

Synagogue

The Jewish community of Affaltrach established a synagogue in 1701.

During the second half of the 18th century, the synagogue was shared with the Jewish community of nearby Eschenau. Between 1820 and 1824, the synagogue was expanded and a women's gallery was added to it, in the cost of about 700 florins. In 1851, a newer synagogue replaced the old one. In addition to the synagogue itself, the building hosted also a teaching room, a teacher's apartment and a Mikveh.

During 1938 Kristallnacht the synagogue was devastated and used as a storeroom and refugee shelter. Nowadays, the synagogue is used as a museum for the Jewish community of Affaltrach and maintained by an association specifically dealing with the building. The museum collection shows a few ritual objects, posters and pictures depicting the history of Jews in the Heilbronn area.

Jewish cemetery

The Affaltrach Jewish cemetery is located to the north of the village itself. The oldest gravestone seen today is dated to 1677. The cemetery served not only Affaltrach but also the nearby villages of Sontheim, Talheim and Horkheim. The cemetery hall and the memorial for the fallen Jewish soldiers who served in the German army during World War I still exist in the cemetery ground. Estimations suggest that the cemetery has around 700 graves, the last one dated to August 1942.

Today, the key to the synagogue is kept at the Protestant Rectory in Affaltrach. Documentation, pictures and details of all gravestones can be reached through the burial book of the Affaltrach cemetery.

Notable residents

Two of the most notable residents of Affaltrach were August Thalheimer and his sister Bertha, both were born in Affaltrach and had family there. August and Bertha were Communist activists during the first half of the 20th century. Bertha and August were first members of the Social Democratic Party of Germany and then were among the founders of the Spartacus League. Later on, while August became the main theorist of the Spartacus League and published several essays on Communism, he exiled to France and eventually to Cuba, where he died in 1948. Bertha stayed in Germany and served two years in prison since October 1917 due to her part in Anti-war demonstrations. During World War II she was deported to Theresienstadt concentration camp in 1943 until she was released in 1945. She died in Stuttgart in 1959.

Reports
During the end of the 19th century and the beginning of the 20th century, some reports about the Jewish community of Affaltrach were published and still exist today.

Anti-Semitic incident in 1899
In February 1899, an article describing an anti-Semitic incident in Affaltrach was published in Allgemeine Zeitung des Judentums. Apparently, a few young men attacked a few Jewish shop owners in Affaltrach, causing them slight injuries and insulting Judaism. They were given trials and were sentenced to about 14 days of prison and a fine, though some irregularities were found in the process of the trial, according to the article itself.

Newspaper articles
Some Jewish newspapers dating to the first decades of the 20th centuries depict ordinary life and occasions among the Affaltrach Jewish community. It can be found here.

References

External links
 location map of the Jewish cemetery.
 recent pictures of the cemetery.
 map location of the Affaltrach Jewish synagogue.
 pictures of the Affaltrach synagogue.
 .
 Family tree of Affaltrach Jewish residents Krailsheimer family.
 German Wikipedia article about the Jewish cemetery.

Affaltrach
Affaltrach Jews
Affaltrach